In organic chemistry, S-nitrosothiols, also known as thionitrites, are organic compounds or functional groups containing a nitroso group attached to the sulfur atom of a thiol. S-Nitrosothiols have the general formula , where R denotes an organic group. Originally suggested by Ignarro to serve as intermediates in the action of organic nitrates, endogenous S-nitrosothiols were discovered by Stamler and colleagues (S-nitrosoalbumin in plasma and S-nitrosoglutathione in airway lining fluid) and shown to represent a main source of NO bioactivity in vivo. More recently, S-nitrosothiols have been implicated as primary mediators of protein S-nitrosylation, the oxidative modification of cysteine thiol that provides ubiquitous regulation of protein function.    

S-Nitrosothiols have received much attention in biochemistry because they serve as donors of both the nitrosonium ion  and of nitric oxide and thus best rationalize the chemistry of NO-based signaling in living systems, especially related to vasodilation. Red blood cells, for instance, carry an essential reservoir of S-nitrosohemoglobin and release S-nitrosothiols into the bloodstream under low-oxygen conditions, causing the blood vessels to dilate.

S-nitrosothiols are composed of small molecules, peptides and proteins. The addition of a nitroso group to a sulfur atom of an amino acid residue of a protein is known as S-nitrosylation or S-nitrosation. This is a reversible process and a major form of posttranslational modification of proteins.

S-Nitrosylated proteins (SNO-proteins) serve to transmit nitric oxide (NO) bioactivity and to regulate protein function through enzymatic mechanisms analogous to phosphorylation and ubiquitinylation: SNO donors target specific amino acids motifs; post-translational modification leads to changes in protein activity, protein interactions, or subcellular location of target proteins; all major classes of proteins can undergo S-nitrosylation, which is mediated by enzymes that add (nitrosylases) and remove (denitrosylases) SNO from proteins, respectively. Accordingly, nitric oxide synthase (NOS) activity does not directly lead to SNO formation, but rather requires an additional class of enzymes (SNO synthases), which catalyze denovo S-nitrosylation. NOSs ultimately target specific Cys residues for S-nitrosylation through conjoint actions of SNO-synthases and transnitrosylases (transnitrosation reactions), which are involved in virtually all forms of cell signaling, ranging from regulation of ion channels and G-protein coupled reactions to receptor stimulation and activation of nuclear regulatory protein.

Structure and reactions
The prefix "S" indicates that the NO group is attached to sulfur. The  angle is near 114°, reflecting the influence of the lone pair of electrons on nitrogen.

S-Nitrosothiols may arise from condensation from nitrous acid and a thiol:
RSH + HONO -> RSNO + H2O
Other methods for their synthesis.

Once formed, these deeply colored compounds are often thermally unstable with respect to formation of the disulfide and nitric oxide:
2 RSNO -> RSSR + 2 NO

S-Nitrosothiols release nitrosonium ions upon treatment with acids:
RSNO + H+ -> RSH + NO+
and they can transfer nitroso groups to other thiols:
RSNO + R'SH -> RSH + R'SNO

Detection
S-Nitrosothiols can be detected with UV-vis spectroscopy.

Examples

 S-Nitrosoglutathione (GSNO)
 S-Nitroso-N-acetylpenicillamine (SNAP)
 S-Nitrosotriphenylmethanethiol

References

Functional groups
Nitroso compounds
Sulfur compounds